Eerik Kantola (born 9 March 2000) is a Finnish football player who plays as defender for the reserve team of Veikkausliiga club RoPS.

Career

Club career
Kantola made his professional debut in a Finnish Cup game against AC Oulu on February 6, 2017. In the Veikkausliiga, Kantola played his first game on May 19, 2017 against SJK.

References

External links

2000 births
Living people
Finnish footballers
Association football defenders
Rovaniemen Palloseura players
Veikkausliiga players
Kakkonen players